Sandra Markle is an American author of children's books. She has published more than 200 non-fiction books for children. She worked on a project for the National Science Foundation called Kit & Kaboodle which helped students to understand science better. She has won many awards for her books.

Early life
She was born on November 10, 1946 in Fostoria, Ohio, and graduated from Fostoria High School and Bowling Green State University, Bowling Green, Ohio. She worked as an elementary and middle school teacher until 1979 at which time she started being a full-time writer.

Career
She has published more than 200 non-fiction books for children, primarily on science topics. She appeared as Ms. Whiz on local television in Asheville, North Carolina and Atlanta, Georgia. She wrote and helped developed science specials for CNN and PBS. She also produced the first on-line interactive program from Antarctica in 1996: On-line Expedition Antarctica. She has also written fiction, creating the young adult novel, The Fledglings (now available as an e-book "Soaring Like Eagles"), and a series of poetic prose natural history stories, including The Long, Long Journey, and Waiting For Ice. Sandra Markle is particularly noted for her work in sharing scientists as detectives solving real-life mysteries, including "The Case of the Vanishing Golden Frogs", "The Case of the Vanishing Honeybees", and "The Case of the Vanishing Little Brown Bats".

Unique experiences
Markle was chosen to journey to Antarctica in 1996 and 1998 as part of the National Science Foundation's Artists and Writers Program. A number of books came out of her experiences in Antarctica, including A Mother's Journey (Charlesbridge, 2005).

Markle also worked on a project for the National Science Foundation called Kit & Kaboodle. Its goal was to make science more interactive in order to improve student understanding of basic curriculum concepts. The results of independent testing conducted by Georgia State University revealed that students participating in Kit & Kaboodle scored significantly higher on related skills tests than those that did not. Kit & Kaboodle has been used by thousands of schools in all fifty states plus eleven countries.

Partial list of awards
AAAS SB&F Award For Excellence in Science Books (Middle Grade Level)
Bank Street College of Education's list of "Best Children's Books of the Year"
Boston Globe-Horn Book Awards Honor Book
Children's Book Council/International Reading Association Children's Book Choice
International Reading Association Teacher's Choice Awards List
Nick Jr. Magazine's Best Books of the Year
Texas Blue Bonnet selection
Texas Mockingbird Award
John Burroughs List of Nature Books for Young Readers
Various selections for the Outstanding Science Trade Books for Students lists of the National Science Teachers Association.

Sources
Interviews with NZ Children's Authors: Sandra Markle
Ohio Center For The Book: Cleveland Public Library "Ohio Authors: Sandra Markle"
Teaching with Children's Books: A Scientific Approach by Lisa Von Drasek from Teachi

References
Outstanding Science Trade Books for Students K-12 National Science Teachers Association
Sandra Markle's official website http://sandra-markle.blogspot.com

1946 births
Living people
American children's writers
People from Fostoria, Ohio
Bowling Green State University alumni